Karbach may refer to:

Karbach, Bavaria, a market community in the Main-Spessart district of Lower Franconia in Bavaria, Germany
Karbach, Rhineland-Palatinate, an Ortsgemeinde in the Rhein-Hunsrück-Kreis in Rhineland-Palatinate, Germany
 FC Karbach, a German association football club from Karbach
Karbach (Main), a river of Bavaria, Germany, tributary of the Main
Karbach Brewing Company, a macrobrewery based in Houston, Texas, USA